Gramsh is a settlement in the Lezhë County, northwestern Albania. It was part of the former municipality Dajç. At the 2015 local government reform it became part of the municipality Lezhë.

References

Populated places in Lezhë
Villages in Lezhë County